Luis Alberto Flores Asturias (born 29 October 1947) is a Guatemalan athlete and politician who served as Vice President of Guatemala from January 1996 to January 2000 in the cabinet of president Álvaro Arzú. He also competed in the men's decathlon at the 1972 Summer Olympics.

References

1947 births
Living people
Athletes (track and field) at the 1972 Summer Olympics
Guatemalan decathletes
Olympic athletes of Guatemala
Guatemalan sportsperson-politicians
Vice presidents of Guatemala
National Advancement Party politicians
Place of birth missing (living people)